The 1987 Giro del Trentino was the 11th edition of the Tour of the Alps cycle race and was held on 6 May to 9 May 1987. The race started in Serrada and finished in Arco di Trentino. The race was won by Claudio Corti.

General classification

References

1987
1987 in road cycling
1987 in Italian sport